Kaina is a village in Singhia block in Rosera Subdivision in Samastipur District in the state of Bihar, India. Kaina has 5 localities named Panchkhuttee, Tinkhuttee, Pachwair toal, Tola and Mandal Tol. Its population is around 2331.

Kaina is mostly a village of Brahmins(maithil), 80% of the population have the surname Jha. 4 ponds and 4 temples are situated in the village. Literacy level is almost 80 to 85% in the village.

External links
 
 

Villages in Samastipur district